Berthe Hoola van Nooten (née Bartha Hendrica Philippina van Dolder; 12 October 1817 in Utrecht – 12 April 1892 in Tanah Abang), was a Dutch botanical artist, noted for her botanical plates illustrating "Fleurs, Fruits et Feuillages Choisis de l'Ile de Java" in 1863-64. Hoola van Nooten is denoted by the author abbreviation Hoola van Nooten when citing a botanical name.

Life
Berthe was the daughter of Johannes Wilhelmus van Dolder, a vicar, and his wife Philippina Maria Batenburg. On 11 July 1838 in Wageningen, she married Dirk Hoola van Nooten, a judge in Paramaribo. Interested in botany, she regularly sent specimens of cultivated plants to botanical gardens in the Netherlands, collected on trips through Suriname with her husband. She and her husband later moved to New Orleans where they established a Protestant school for girls connected to the Protestant Episcopal Church. Personal tragedy struck with her husband's death from yellow fever in 1847, leaving her with a young family of five. She was judged competent by the church and allowed to continue the school. After a stay in Europe the New Orleans school was re-established in Plaquemine, Louisiana, in 1850. She then moved to Galveston. In January 1854, The Galveston News reported that Mrs. van Nooten's Young Ladies Institute, for which she purchased a 'large and handsome residence', was operational. In October and November 1855, however, the same paper published repeated court orders for B. H. van Nooten, who had argued she was not a resident of Texas, to appear for the Justice of the Peace to answer to creditors. She then travelled to the island of Java with her brother, a highly successful merchant in the business of sugar, machines and life insurance. Having arrived in Java she applied for a Government subsidy for setting up a Protestant girls school to countenance the influence of Roman Catholic seminaries. 

Hoola van Nooten was also interested in the indigenous flora of Java and gave drawing lessons, where she befriended the Javanese botanical illustrator, Radhen Salikin, who was familiar with the local flora. She produced 40 plates depicting interesting plant species from Java, following the precedents set by Maria Sibylla Merian and Elizabeth Blackwell. The drawings would make up the illustrated work Fleurs, Fruits et Feuillages, choisis de l'île Java: peints d'après nature. The illustrations are accompanied by descriptions in French and English, describing the plant's history and uses. The work was published in Brussels in 1863, and was dedicated to Sophia Mathilde, wife of King William III of the Netherlands, whose patronage she had acquired. The well executed chromolithographs were done by Pieter De Pannemaeker, the Belgian lithographer operating from Ledeberg in Ghent. 

In 1872, Hoola van Nooten met Alexei Alexandrovitch, son of tsar Alexander II of Russia, who was visiting Batavia on diplomatic business. Hoola van Noten gifted him a copy of Fleurs, Fruits, et Feuillages and she received a bracelet in return. 

Although the book was published in a number of editions, Hoola van Nooten died in poverty in Tanah Abang at the age of 74. The Hoola van Nooten family name is today respected in the Netherlands, and is listed in the Nederlands Patriciaat, a register of Dutch families who have played a significant role in Dutch society over the past 150 years.

References

External links 

 Botanicus
 Missouri Botanical Garden
 Rare Books
 The book to browse on the site of the Teylers Museum, Haarlem, The Netherlands

1817 births
1892 deaths
Artists from Utrecht
19th-century Dutch botanists
Dutch illustrators
Dutch women illustrators
19th-century Dutch women scientists
Women botanists
Dutch botanical artists
Scientists from Utrecht (city)